The British Rail Class 756 FLIRT is a class of tri-mode multiple units being built for Transport for Wales Rail by Swiss rolling stock manufacturer Stadler Rail. They are closely related to the  bi-mode units delivered by Stadler to Greater Anglia between 2018 and 2020, which can be powered either by overhead electric lines or on-board diesel generators, but Class 756 units will also carry batteries as an additional source of traction power.

A total of 24 units are to be built, split between seven three-car units and 17 four-car units.

History
The Wales & Borders rail franchise, awarded to KeolisAmey Wales with effect from 14 October 2018, included a commitment requiring that the operator oversee a full fleet replacement during the franchise period. As part of this process, KeolisAmey placed an order with Stadler in February 2019 for the 24 FLIRT tri-mode units that came to be designated Class 756. The tri-mode capabilities are intended to facilitate operations over lines that have only been partially electrified. Production of the fleet was underway by mid-2021, and entry into service is expected in 2023.

Operators

Transport for Wales
When built, Transport for Wales Rail Class 756 units will operate services on the Rhymney line and Vale of Glamorgan Line.

Technical details
Class 756 units have three or four passenger vehicles, along with a separate "Power Pack" vehicle near the centre of the unit that contains a diesel generator set and three battery modules. All vehicles are linked by unpowered Jacobs bogies, while the outermost bogie at each end of each unit carries the traction motors.

Fleet details

Notes

References

External links

756
Stadler Rail multiple units
Hybrid multiple units
25 kV AC multiple units
Train-related introductions in 2023